The 1973 Rallye de Portugal (formally the 7th TAP Rally of Portugal) was the third round of the inaugural World Rally Championship season.  Run in mid-March in southern Portugal on a mixture of asphalt and gravel, the rally began with a concentration run from a number of European cities, covering about 4,600 km and ending in Estoril, Portugal.

Report 
In 1973, and for several years afterward, only manufacturers were given points for finishes in WRC events.  As in the earlier Monte Carlo Rally, the Alpine A110s led the event, taking first and second place well ahead of other competitors.  Fiat had a disastrous rally, with all three of its cars failing to finish, limiting Fiat to points gained from local entrants.  Despite a significant number of international entries, only four non-Portuguese teams finished in the top 15 at the end.

Results 

Source: Independent WRC archive

Championship standings after the event

References

External links 
 Official website of the World Rally Championship
 1973 Rallye de Portugal, WRC Round 3  at Rallye-info 

Portugal
Rally of Portugal
Rally de Portugal